David A. Anderson,  (born August 16, 1937) is a former Canadian cabinet minister.

Anderson was born in Victoria, British Columbia. He was educated at Victoria College, Aiglon College and at the University of British Columbia Faculty of Law; he graduated in 1962 with a LLB. During his UBC days Anderson won a silver medal for rowing in the 1960 Olympic Games, and a silver medal in the Pan American Games in Chicago in 1959. He was also a pilot in the University Reserve of the Royal Canadian Air Force.

Anderson served as a foreign service officer in the Department of External Affairs between 1962 and 1968. His posts included Indochina (International Supervisory And Truce Commissions) 1963–64, Assistant Canadian Trade Commissioner in Hong Kong, 1964–1967, and China Desk Officer in Ottawa 1967–68.  In Hong Kong, Anderson attended the Institute of Oriental Studies of the University of Hong Kong and obtained the British Foreign Officer Higher Standard Certificate in Mandarin.

He was elected Liberal MP for the constituency of Esquimalt—Saanich on Vancouver Island in the 1968 federal election. Four years later he switched to provincial politics, and was elected leader of the provincial Liberal Party (April 1972), then the third party in the provincial legislature with 5 out of 55 seats.  Although elected himself in the 1972 election, representing the constituency of Victoria, the Liberal Party did not increase its seat total. Anderson served as Member of the Legislative Assembly until his defeat in December 1975.

During this period of elected office Anderson was prominent in representing Canadian concerns over offshore oil drilling, pipeline developments in Northern Canada, and oil tanker traffic between Alaska and the Lower 48 states.

Between 1976 and 1984, Anderson worked as an environmental consultant and adjunct professor at the University of Victoria's School of Administration, where he taught in the fields of constitutional and administrative law, and environmental policy. His environmental work focused on coastal and wetland protection and marine pollution from oil exploration and transportation.

Anderson was appointed as a member of the Immigration Appeal Board for a 10-year term in 1984. He served from March 1, 1984, until December 31, 1988, when the board was dissolved.

In the 1993 federal general election Anderson re-entered elected politics. He was elected MP for Victoria and retained this position for three subsequent elections, ending when he retired from politics in January 2006. During this period, he served in the cabinet of Prime Minister Jean Chrétien as Minister of National Revenue (1993–95), Minister of Transport (1995–97), and Minister of Fisheries and Oceans (1997–99). He also was appointed the regional political minister for British Columbia, which he retained until 2002.

Anderson's time in the fisheries portfolio was marked by considerable controversy with the commercial fishing industry as he worked for strict conservation measures to protect fish stocks. These measures including a complete ban on the killing of Coho salmon in 1998. After six years of previous failures, he succeeded in getting an agreement with the United States under the Pacific Salmon Treaty to conserve salmon stocks and to end the destructive competitive fishing by the US and Canadian commercial fleets.

In the cabinet shuffle of 1999, Chrétien appointed Anderson Environment Minister. He served in that post for the following five years, making him the longest serving Canadian environment minister. In this period Anderson's work largely centered on the Rio Summit conventions on biodiversity and climate change. He was successful in getting the Species at Risk Act passed by Parliament and signed into law (2004), and, despite strong objections from the governments of Saskatchewan, Alberta and Ontario and the federal Official Opposition, in securing Canadian ratification of the Kyoto Protocol in December 2002.  Other initiatives involved improving air and water quality and established improved federal provincial cooperation on environmental issues.

In international work, Anderson was the first Canadian elected as president of the governing council of the United Nations Environment Programme, a post he held for two years.  He took a prominent part in the G8 and OECD Environment Minister's meetings. Anderson was dropped from cabinet by Prime Minister Paul Martin in 2004 and did not run in the 2006 election.

In February 2007 he was named director of the Guelph Institute for the Environment, from which he retired in 2010.

Anderson has received a number of environmental awards, including the John Fraser Award for Environmental Achievement from the Sierra Club of Canada (2005), the Dr. Andrew Thompson Award from West Coast Environmental Law for his lifetime contributions to the environment and sustainability in British Columbia (2004), and the 50th anniversary International Conservation Award (1998) from the Atlantic Salmon Federation.

He was awarded an honorary doctoral degree in laws by the University of Victoria in 2007, and an honorary doctorate of science from Wilfrid Laurier University in 2009.  He was appointed an Officer of the Order of Canada in 2010 and named to the Order of British Columbia in 2018.

Anderson is married with two children.

Archives 
There is a David Anderson fonds at Library and Archives Canada.

References

External links
 
 
 
 
 
 

1937 births
Living people
British Columbia Liberal Party MLAs
Canadian Anglicans
Canadian Ministers of Transport
Canadian sportsperson-politicians
Lawyers in British Columbia
Leaders of the British Columbia Liberal Party
Liberal Party of Canada MPs
Members of the House of Commons of Canada from British Columbia
Members of the King's Privy Council for Canada
Olympic medalists in rowing
Olympic rowers of Canada
Olympic silver medalists for Canada
Officers of the Order of Canada
Pan American Games silver medalists for Canada
Politicians from Victoria, British Columbia
Rowers at the 1960 Summer Olympics
Rowers from Victoria, British Columbia
Members of the 26th Canadian Ministry
Members of the 27th Canadian Ministry
Canadian male rowers
Peter A. Allard School of Law alumni
Pan American Games medalists in rowing
Rowers at the 1959 Pan American Games
Medalists at the 1960 Summer Olympics
Medalists at the 1959 Pan American Games
Alumni of Aiglon College
Members of the Order of British Columbia